The George Town trolleybus system was part of the public transport network in George Town, on the island of Penang (part of Malaysia since 1963), for more than 35 years in the mid-20th century.

Opened in 1924, the system gradually replaced the George Town tramway network. It lasted until mid-1961, when it was closed and replaced by a network of motor bus routes. At its peak, the system had four routes.

History
In 1923 a 24-seat Brush bodied Clough, Smith trolleybus was ordered as an experiment, entering service in 1925 on the Magazine Road to Jetty via Chulia Street service. It was followed by a 22-seat Strachans & Brown bodied Thornycroft. In 1926 three trolleybuses were purchased from Ransomes, Sims & Jefferies, who supplied another five in March 1929. Two existing Thornycroft motor buses were converted to trolleybuses in 1929 and 1931, respectively.

In 1934, two nine-seater trolleybuses were purchased specifically for the one mile Penang Hill Railway service from Lower station to the Air Itam main road. A further 18 Ransomes, Sims & Jefferies trolleybuses were delivered in 1935/36. Six more followed in 1938-1940.

By the end of the Japanese occupation of Malaya, the entire fleet was out of service. All were gradually returned to service between 1946 and 1950 except two that were too badly damaged. In the 1950s the original fleet was replaced by 26 Sunbeams and five 1935 built AEC 664T double-deckers purchased second-hand from London. The network closed on 31 July 1961.

Fleet

See also
 History of Malaysia
 List of trolleybus systems
 Transport in Penang

References

External links

David Bradley Online – Georgetown Trolleybus Fleet

George Town
History of George Town, Penang
Transport in Penang
Trolleybus transport in Malaysia
1924 establishments in British Malaya
1961 disestablishments in Malaya